Endotricha denticostalis is a species of snout moth in the genus Endotricha. It was described by George Hampson, in 1906, and is known from Borneo.

References

Endotrichini
Moths described in 1906